Eukaryotic elongation factor-2 kinase (eEF-2 kinase or eEF-2K), also known as calmodulin-dependent protein kinase III (CAMKIII) and calcium/calmodulin-dependent eukaryotic elongation factor 2 kinase, is an enzyme that in humans is encoded by the EEF2K gene.

Function 

eEF-2 kinase is a highly conserved protein kinase in the calmodulin-mediated signaling pathway that links multiple up-stream signals to the regulation of protein synthesis. It phosphorylates eukaryotic elongation factor 2 (EEF2) and thus inhibits the EEF2 function.

Activation 

The activity of eEF-2K is dependent on calcium and calmodulin. Activation of eEF-2K proceeds by a sequential two-step mechanism. First, calcium-calmodulin binds with high affinity to activate the kinase domain, triggering rapid autophosphorylation of Thr-348. In the second step, autophosphorylation of Thr-348 leads to a conformational change in the kinase likely supported by the binding of phospho-Thr-348 to an allosteric phosphate binding pocket in the kinase domain. This increases the activity of eEF-2K against its substrate, elongation factor 2.

eEF-2K can gain calcium-independent activity through autophosphorylation of Ser-500. However, calmodulin must remain bound to the enzyme for its activity to be sustained.

Clinical significance 

The activity of this kinase is increased in many cancers and may be a valid target for anti-cancer treatment.

It is also suggested that eEF-2K may play a role the rapid anti-depressant effects of ketamine through its regulation of neuronal protein synthesis.

Cancer 
eEF-2K expression is often upregulated in cancer cells, including breast and pancreatic cancers and promotes cell proliferation, survival, motility/migration, invasion and tumorigenesis.

References

Further reading 

 
 
 
 
 
 
 
 
 
 
 
 
 
 
 
 
 

EC 2.7.11